Steven Robert "Steve" Barker (born 23 December 1967) is a South African former football (soccer) player and coach currently managing South African Premier Division club Stellenbosch F.C.

Personal life

Born in Maseru, Lesotho, he is the nephew of South African coach Clive Barker.

Playing career
Barker played club football for Wits University and SuperSport United.

Coaching career
He led the University of Pretoria to promotion to the Premier Soccer League in May 2012.
He left AmaTuks in November 2014 to join AmaZulu.

References

1967 births
Living people
People from Maseru
South African soccer managers
South African soccer players
Association football midfielders
Bidvest Wits F.C. players
SuperSport United F.C. players
White South African people